Antonio Saloso (born 4 September 1940) is a Filipino former swimmer. He competed in two events at the 1960 Summer Olympics.

References

1940 births
Living people
Filipino male swimmers
Olympic swimmers of the Philippines
Swimmers at the 1960 Summer Olympics
People from Sulu
Asian Games medalists in swimming
Asian Games silver medalists for the Philippines
Swimmers at the 1962 Asian Games
Medalists at the 1962 Asian Games
20th-century Filipino people
21st-century Filipino people